John Scott (born unknown in Scotland died 19??) was a Scottish footballer who played for Sunderland as a forward. He made his debut for Sunderland on 13 September 1890 against Burnley, Sunderland lost the game 3–2. Overall Scott made 96 league appearances for Sunderland, scoring 26 goals.

References

John Scott's careers stats at The Stat Cat

Year of birth missing
Year of death missing
Scottish footballers
Association football wingers
Albion Rovers F.C. players
Third Lanark A.C. players
South Shields F.C. (1889) players
Sunderland A.F.C. players
English Football League players